The Jardin botanique exotique de Menton (11,000 m²), also known as the Jardin botanique exotique du Val Rahmeh, is a botanical garden located off Avenue St Jacques, Menton, Alpes-Maritimes, Provence-Alpes-Côte d'Azur, France. It is open daily except Tuesday; an admission fee is charged.

The garden can be traced back to 1875 when the De Monléon family constructed the property. In 1905 Lord Percy Radcliffe, former governor of Malta, with his spouse Rahmeh acquired the property, adding adjacent farmland to form a garden. In 1957 Miss May Sherwood Campbell acquired the property and a second garden, now accessed by a bridge, and created a pond with water hyacinths, water lilies, and papyrus. In 1966 she donated her property to the nation, which transferred it to the Ministry of National Education. It then became a research center for Mediterranean flora managed by the National Museum of Natural History. The garden opened to the public in 1967.

Today the garden contains some 1,500 taxa growing within a microclimate of high humidity where temperatures rarely fall below 5 °C (41 °F) in winter. It features Sophora toromiro (a species of small trees since disappeared from Easter Island), as well as  exceptional olive trees (more than 400 years old) and collections of exotic plants including palm trees, chorisia, datura, and lotus, plus fine collections of citrus, olives, and palm trees. Rare species include Aloe marlothii, Araucaria columnaris, Castanospermum australe (Moreton Bay chestnut), Cnicothamnus lorentzi, and Ficus religiosa. A small rainforest area contains bamboo, gingers, philodendrons, tropical fruit trees, and a path through spices and herbs. The garden also contains an excellent Musa basjoo and a two Chorisia speciosa specimens.

Gallerie

See also 
 List of botanical gardens in France

References 

 Jardin botanique exotique de Menton
 National Museum of Natural History article (French)
 Jardins de Menton description (French)
 Cote d'Azur entry (French)
 Gralon.net entry (French)
 Penelope Hobhouse, Patrick Taylor, The Garden Lover's Guide to France, Princeton Architectural Press, 1998, pages 140-141. .

Gardens in Menton
Menton, Jardin botanique exotique